Gdynia Grabówek railway station is a railway station serving the city of Gdynia, in the Pomeranian Voivodeship, Poland. The station opened in 1951 and is located on the Gdańsk Śródmieście–Rumia railway. The train services are operated by SKM Tricity.

Train services
The station is served by the following service(s):

Szybka Kolej Miejska services (SKM) (Lębork -) Wejherowo - Reda - Rumia - Gdynia - Sopot - Gdansk

References 

 This article is based upon a translation of the Polish language version as of October 2016.

External links

Railway stations in Poland opened in 1951
Railway stations served by Szybka Kolej Miejska (Tricity)
Grabowek